The Boulevard du Temple, formerly nicknamed the "Boulevard du Crime", is a thoroughfare in Paris that separates the 3rd arrondissement from the 11th. It runs from the Place de la République to the Place Pasdeloup, and its name refers to the nearby Knights Templars' Temple, where they established their Paris priory.

History

The Boulevard du Temple follows the path of the city wall constructed by Charles V (the so-called Enceinte, constructed between 1356 and 1383) and demolished under Louis XIV. The boulevard, lined with trees, was built between 1656 and 1705.

From the time of Louis XVI (1774–1792) until the July Monarchy in 1830, the Boulevard du Temple was  popular and fashionable. It was a place for walking and recreation. Cafés and theatres previously located at the Saint-Laurent and Saint-Germain fairs moved here.  After a time, it was nicknamed the Boulevard du Crime after the crime melodramas that were so popular in its many theatres. In 1782, Philippe Curtius, Madame Tussaud's tutor in wax modelling, opened his second exhibition on this Boulevard.

On this boulevard, on 28 July 1835, Giuseppe Fieschi made an attempt on the life of the king, Louis-Philippe. The attempt failed, but it resulted in 18 dead and 23 injured. Gustave Flaubert spent several months each winter at 42, boulevard du Temple from 1856 to 1869.

A photograph of this street was taken in 1838 by Louis Daguerre from high in his 350-seat Diorama Building at 4, Rue Sanson, where it intersected with the Rue des Marais, and which from the rear looked out roughly southwards over the rooftops towards Boulevard du Temple (since demolished, the place where it stood is at the south side of Rue Léon Jouhaux just off the north corner of Place de la République). The image is one of the earlier Daguerreotypes (invented 1837), and it is thus believed to be the earliest surviving photograph showing a person. A man stopped to have his shoes shined, and by remaining still, he (though not his head) unwittingly became captured on the plate, while all the other traffic rushing through the street vanished from the image due to the long time of exposure. The exposure of this shot was 4 to 5 minutes.

The transformations of Paris by Baron Haussmann radically modified this part of Le Marais; today, only the Théâtre Déjazet remains of the late 18th century theatres; half of them were demolished for the enlargement of the Place de la République.

Theatres

The history of the names of the theatres at various sites on the boulevard du Temple is summarized in the following list. Unless otherwise noted the names and dates are from Lecomte, and the street addresses are based on the 1861 Paris guide of Lehaguez.
 1759: Théâtre de Nicolet, ou des Grands Danseurs
 moved across the street to 58 boulevard du Temple in 1764
 Grands-Danseurs du Roi (acquired this name in 1772)
 Théâtre de la Gaîté (acquired this name in 1792)
 rebuilt in 1808 and 1835 after a fire
 The company relocated to the rue Papin in 1862.
 The building on the boulevard du Temple was demolished sometime thereafter.
 1769: Théâtre de l'Ambigu-Comique of Nicolas-Médard Audinot
 located at 62 boulevard du Temple
 destroyed by fire in 1827 (relocated to 2 boulevard Saint-Martin)
 replaced by the Théâtre des Folies-Dramatiques (1st, 1831)
 expropriated in 1862
 1774: Théâtre des Associés
 located at 52 boulevard du Temple
 Théâtre Amusements-Comiques (1787)
 Théâtre Patriotique (1790)
 Théâtre Sans-Prétention (1797)
 Closed in 1807 by Napoleon's decree on the theatres, it became the Café d'Apollon.
 Théâtre de Madame Saqui (1816)
 Théâtre du Temple (1832, a vaudeville house run by Roux, dit Dorsay)
 Théâtre des Délassements-Comiques (3rd, 1841, this company relocated to the rue de Provence in 1862)
 Théâtre du boulevard du Temple (1862, for two weeks in July, relocated to the Théâtre Lyrique, reopening with the name Théâtre Historique)
 The building on this site was later demolished.
 1779: Théâtre des Élèves pour la Danse de l'Opéra
 probably located at 48 boulevard du Temple
 Lycée-Dramatique (1791)
 Théâtre Lazzari (1st, 1792, also spelled Lazari or Lazary)
 Théâtre Français du boulevard (1793)
 Théâtre des Variétés-Amusantes (2nd, 1793)
 destroyed by fire in 1798
 1785: Théâtre des Délassements-Comiques (1st), of Plancher ('Aristide Valcour')
 located between the Hôtel Foulon [site of the later Théâtre Historique] and the site of the later Cirque-Olympique
 Théâtre Lyri-Comique (1800)
 Théâtre des Variétés-Amusantes (3rd, 1803)
 Nouveaux Troubadours (1805)
 Closed in 1807 by Napoleon's decree on the theatres, most of the building was demolished except for the entry hall, which continued to be used for exhibiting trained dogs and monkeys performing tricks.
 1787: Théâtre des Bluettes comiques et lyriques
 Théâtre des Élèves de Thalie (1791)
 1787: Cabinet des figures de cire (Cabinet of wax figures), disappeared in 1847
 1813: Théâtre des Funambules (1st)
 located at 54 boulevard du Temple
 The company relocated to the boulevard de Strasbourg in 1862, closing after one year.
 The building on the boulevard du Temple was demolished on 18 July 1862.
 1821: Théâtre Lazzari (2nd)
 located at 50 boulevard du Temple
 Spectacle Lazzari
 Théâtre de Petit-Lazzari
 Théâtre Lazzari (also spelled Lazary, demolished sometime after 1862)
 1821: Panorama-Dramatique
 located at 48 boulevard du Temple
 The theatre closed after 21 August 1823 and was replaced with a six-story residential building.
 1827: Cirque-Olympique (3rd)
 located at 66 boulevard du Temple
 Opéra-National (1st, 1847, this company reopened at the Théâtre Historique in 1851)
 Théâtre National du Cirque (1848)
 Théâtre Impérial du Cirque (1853, relocated to the theatre on the Place du Châtelet in 1862)
 The building on this site was later demolished.
 1846: Théâtre Historique (1st)
 located at 72 boulevard du Temple
 Opéra-National (2nd, 1851)
 Théâtre Lyrique (1st, 1852)
 Théâtre Historique (2nd, 1862, name revived by the Théâtre du boulevard du Temple)
 This building was demolished in 1863.
 1853: Théâtre des Folies-Concertantes
 located at 41 boulevard du Temple, on the site of the former concert-bal, the Folies-Mayer
 Théâtre des Folies-Nouvelles (1854)
 Théâtre Déjazet (1859)
 Théâtre des Folies-Nouvelles (1872)
 Théâtre Déjazet (1873)
 Troisième Théâtre Français (1876)
 Théâtre des Folies-Nouvelles (1880)
 Théâtre Déjazet (1880–)

Metro stations
The Boulevard du Temple is:
 It is also  It is served by lines 3, 5, 8, 9,  and 11.

References
Notes

Sources
 Brazier, [Nicolas] (1838). Histoire des petits théâtres de Paris, new edition, volume one. Paris: Allardin. View at Google Books.
 Chauveau, Philippe (1999). Les théâtres parisiens disparus, 1402–1986. Paris: Éditions de l'Amandier. .
 Colette, Marie-Noëlle (1983). La Musique à Paris en 1830-1831. Paris: Bibliothèque Nationale. .
 Goncourt, Edmond de; Goncourt, Jules de (2005). Journal des Goncourt, volume 1: 1851–1857. Paris: H. Champion. .
 Hemmings, F. W. J. (1994). Theatre and State in France, 1760–1905. New York: Cambridge University Press. .  (2006 paperback reprint).
 Lecomte, Louis-Henry (1905). Histoire des théâtres 1402–1904. Notice préliminaire. Paris: Daragon. View at Google Books.
 Lehaguez, M. (1861). Le nouveau Paris et ses environs. Guide de l'étranger. Paris: A. Lehaguez. View at Google Books.
 Lust, Annette Bercut (2002). From the Greek Mimes to Marcel Marceau and Beyond. Lanham, Maryland: Scarecrow Press. .
 McCormick, John (1993). Popular Theatres of Nineteenth Century France. New York: Routledge. .
 Planta, Edward (1821). A New Picture of Paris; or, The Stranger's Guide to the French Metropolis. London: Samuel Lee and Baldwin, Craddock. View at Google Books.
 Some of the information on this page has been translated from its French equivalent.

Temple, Boulevard du
3rd arrondissement of Paris
11th arrondissement of Paris
Louis Philippe I

hu:Boulevard du Temple (dagerrotípia)